Nowe Niemyje  is a village in the administrative district of Gmina Rudka, within Bielsk County, Podlaskie Voivodeship, in north-eastern Poland.

References

Nowe Niemyje